On October 15, 2008, Michael Mineo was arrested and allegedly sodomized by New York City Police Department (NYPD) officers in the Prospect Park subway station in Flatbush, Brooklyn, New York. According to Mineo, the arresting police officers pinned him to the ground, while Richard Kern, one of the officers, pulled down Mineo's pants and sodomized him with a police baton.  On December 9, 2008, the Brooklyn District Attorney indicted the three arresting officers and charged them with felonies. Kern was charged with aggravated sexual abuse in the first degree, assault in the first degree, and hindering prosecution. Two other officers — Andrew Morales and Alex Cruz — were charged with hindering prosecution and official misconduct. All three officers were tried and found not guilty of all charges.

Background 
Michael Mineo was born  in either Flatbush or in Dallas, Texas. He is Italian-Puerto Rican. Both of his parents died of drug overdoses when he was around eleven years old. He then moved in with his mother's parents, but they both died by the time he was fourteen. He then moved in with an aunt by marriage and her husband who lived in Lancaster, Pennsylvania. Mineo was under indictment on felony assault charges stemming from an unrelated incident for which he was arrested on April 18, 2008.  Mineo's defense for his indictment was a legal aid attorney, but following the alleged incident on October 15 he hired a private attorney.  In the fall of 2003, Mineo stole his friend's mother's credit cards and placed more than $6,000 on the card.  During that time, he left for New York City; soon thereafter he was arrested on marijuana possession and was found to be carrying the stolen credit cards.

In 2007, New York City paid out $50,000 to settle two excessive force lawsuits filed against Richard Kern. However, the Civilian Complaint Review Board cleared him of wrongdoing and Kern says the excessive force claims were a "complete lie".

Incident 
On October 15, 2008, Michael Mineo was allegedly smoking a marijuana joint outside the Prospect Park station in Flatbush. When approached by police officers, Mineo ran into the train station, jumped the turnstile, but was caught and handcuffed near the token booth. According to the officers, they found no drugs on him, issued him a summons for disorderly conduct, and let him go. According to Mineo, after he was handcuffed and pinned down, Richard Kern pulled down his pants and shoved a police radio antenna into his anus.  Mineo later changed his version to a police baton. On October 23, Mineo's attorneys announced the incident and noted that they planned to file a lawsuit against New York City on Mineo's behalf.

Speaking before a grand jury in November 2008, Transit Police officer Kevin Maloney testified that police officer Richard Kern jabbed Mineo's buttocks with a police baton, while other witnesses testified that Mineo's bare buttocks were visible and that they heard him screaming: "Don't shove a walkie [talkie] up my ass!" Mineo later praised the Transit Police officer who had testified on his behalf stating "I'm really happy he came out and said what he said. He must have felt bad." Maloney testified that he saw Kern resting his baton on Mineo's left buttock, and he saw half inch to an inch disappear from view. Michael Mineo was hospitalized two times with what sources described as "rectal tears" as a result of the assault.

This case has drawn parallels to a similar set of circumstances that took place in August 1997, in which NYPD officers assaulted and forcibly sodomized Abner Louima with a broken plunger handle after he was arrested. However, there are differences between the Louima and Mineo situations. Louima was black and his 1997 police attackers were white, whereas Mineo is described as white and Hispanic and the involved police officers are white, black and Hispanic.

Criticism 
The NYPD was criticized for not taking Mineo's claims seriously. The accused officers were kept on regular patrol duty for two and half weeks after the incident.  The police maintain that they aggressively located records, reviewed hours of videotape, examined MetroCard records, and retained equipment for DNA testing.

Trial 
The trial of the three police officers began on January 22, 2010.  The prosecution called Mineo, another police officer who witnessed the incident, a doctor who treated Mineo, and a DNA expert from the medical examiner's office.  The defense followed by calling each of the three officers, and a doctor who stated the injuries were not consistent with assault.  The defense submitted a video as evidence that supports the argument that Mineo had a pre-existing medical condition.  During the jury deliberations, one juror was removed because she misinformed the other jurors regarding past allegations against Kern.  The removed juror was replaced with an alternate.  After a couple of days of deliberating, the jury found the three police officers not guilty.  The jury stated to the judge that they had reasonable doubt regarding the incident.

References 

2008 crimes in the United States
2008 in New York City
Crimes in Brooklyn
Criminal trials that ended in acquittal
New York City Police Department corruption and misconduct
Violence against men in North America